Võ Duy Nguy (武彝巍, Ất Sửu 1745 - Tân Dậu 1801) was a Vietnamese admiral, one of three admirals leading the Nguyễn Lord's fleet against the Tây Sơn army in 1793.

References

1745 births
1801 deaths
Mandarins of the Nguyễn lords
Generals of the Nguyễn lords